The Korean Archipelago is a group of about 3,500 islands in the South Sea of Korea, just off the coast of southwestern Korean Peninsula.

Administration
Administratively the group falls in South Jeolla Province and South Gyeongsang Province.

See also
Dadohaehaesang National Park

References

Archipelagoes of South Korea
Landforms of the Yellow Sea